Clymer Meadow Preserve is a Nature Conservancy preserve located in the Blackland Prairie region of north Texas. As of 2021 the area covers about 1400 acres but with the occasional acquisition of new land the preserve slowly continues to expand.

Habitats
The Clymer Meadow Preserve protects one of the largest remaining areas of tallgrass prairie in Texas including two globally imperilled plant communities: Little Bluestem-Indiangrass and Gamagrass-Switchgrass community series types.

External links
 Clymer Meadow Preserve website

Grasslands of Texas
Nature reserves in Texas
Grasslands of the North American Great Plains
Prairies
Protected areas of Hunt County, Texas
Meadows in the United States